MUCL may refer to:

Organisations
 BCCM/MUCL, an environmental and applied mycology collection part of the Belgian Co-ordinated Collections of Micro-organisms
 Vilo Acuña Airport (IATA: CYO, ICAO: MUCL)